Mary-Sophie Harvey (born 11 August 1999) is a Canadian swimmer who competed as part of Team Canada at the 2020 Summer Olympics in Tokyo.

Career
Harvey first appeared on the international junior swimming circuit, representing Canada at two editions of the FINA World Junior Swimming Championships, achieving her best results at the 2015 edition in Singapore, where she won the silver medal in the 200 m freestyle and collected two medals as part of the Canadian girls' teams in the 4x100 and 4x200 m freestyle relays. She competed at the Canadian swimming trials for the 2016 Olympic team, but did not qualify. The following year she qualified for the 2017 World Aquatics Championships, competing in the women's 200 metre freestyle event. Shortly afterward in September 2017, Harvey was named in the Canadian team for the 2018 Commonwealth Games. Her most notable feat at the Commonwealth Games was reaching the final of the 400 m individual medley, where she finished eighth.

Harvey was not chosen for the Canadian team for the 2019 World Aquatics Championships, instead being sent to the 2019 Pan American Games in Lima, where she won four medals, three of them silver. In the Autumn of 2019 she was member of the inaugural International Swimming League swimming for the Energy Standard International Swim Club, who won the team title in Las Vegas, Nevada in December. During the first stop of the tour in Indianapolis, USA, Harvey raced the most metres (1,400m) of any athlete. At the second stop in Naples, ITA she raced 1,200m which was equal furthest racing distance with 3 other athletes. Across these two stops Harvey (2,600m) and team mate, Kregor Zirk (2,250m), had raced more than all other swimmers.

In June 2021, she qualified to represent Canada at the 2020 Summer Olympics, which had been delayed a year because of the COVID-19 pandemic. Harvey competed in the heats of the 4x200 m freestyle relay, helping the team qualify to the final, where she was replaced by Kayla Sanchez. The Canadian team ultimately finished fourth.

Competing at the 2022 World Aquatics Championships, Harvey qualified for her first ever individual World final, finishing eighth in the 200 m individual medley. Of the result she said "I can't really be mad because it was my first final at the Worlds. It was a step in the right direction but not the time and placing I was aiming for." Harvey competed in the heats of the 4×200 m freestyle relay for the Canadian team, helping to the event final, where she was replaced by Summer McIntosh. She shared in the team's bronze medal win. Harvey later reported that she had been drugged on the final night of the World Championships, and woke up with a rib sprain and a "small" concussion, as well as with numerous bruises. She said she had no memory of a period of approximately four to six hours that night.

Later in the summer, Harvey joined her second second Commonwealth Games team, for the 2022 edition in Birmingham. She swam in the heats of the mixed 4×100 m freestyle relay for the Canadian team, being replaced in the event final by Maggie Mac Neil, and shared in the team's bronze medal win. On the second day of competition, Harvey finished sixth in both the heats and semi-finals of the 100 m backstroke. Harvey won a silver medal with the 4×200 m freestyle relay team on the third day of competition. She went on to place sixth in the 100 m backstroke final.

References

External links
 

1999 births
Living people
Canadian female freestyle swimmers
Canadian female butterfly swimmers
Sportspeople from Trois-Rivières
Sportspeople from Laval, Quebec
Olympic swimmers of Canada
Swimmers at the 2020 Summer Olympics
Swimmers at the 2018 Commonwealth Games
Swimmers at the 2022 Commonwealth Games
Commonwealth Games medallists in swimming
Commonwealth Games silver medallists for Canada
Commonwealth Games bronze medallists for Canada
Swimmers at the 2019 Pan American Games
Medalists at the 2019 Pan American Games
Pan American Games medalists in swimming
Pan American Games silver medalists for Canada
Pan American Games bronze medalists for Canada
World Aquatics Championships medalists in swimming
Medalists at the FINA World Swimming Championships (25 m)
Medallists at the 2022 Commonwealth Games